Hypatopa annulipes is a moth in the family Blastobasidae. It is found in Arizona, United States.

References

Moths described in 1910
Hypatopa